The 2017 Russian Super Cup was the 15th annual Russian Super Cup match which was contested between the 2016–17 Russian Premier League champion, Spartak Moscow, and the 2016–17 Russian Cup champion, Lokomotiv Moscow.

The match was held on 14 July 2017 at the RZD Arena, in Moscow and Spartak Moscow won in extra time.

Match details

References 

Russian Super Cup
Super Cup
July 2017 sports events in Russia
FC Lokomotiv Moscow matches
Russian Super Cup 2017
2017 in Moscow
Sports competitions in Moscow